Faded is an EP by American alt-rock band Flagship, released July 10, 2016 by Bright Antenna Records. The album was made available as a Digital Download, and CD. The video for "I Want You" premiered on Earmilk.

Track listing
Merry Us Carry Us - 3:47
Not So Bad - 3:13
Faded - 4:18
I Want You - 4:00
Nothin' - 5:07

Personnel
Produced by Leonard Solis (Tracks 1, 2, 3, & 5) and Joel Khouri (Track 4) 
Mixed by Leonard Solis (Tracks 1, 2, 3, & 5) and Jeremy Sh Griffith (Track 4) 
Mastered by Ryan Smith (Tracks 1, 2, 3, & 5) and Greg Calbi (Track 4) 
A&R by Braden Merrick

References

External links
Faded EP on iTunes
Essentially Pop
Four Culture
Earmilk

2015 EPs
Flagship (band) albums